Mankivka is an urban-type settlement located in Uman Raion of Cherkasy Oblast (province) in central Ukraine. It hosts the administration of Mankivka settlement hromada, one of the hromadas of Ukraine. Population: 

Until 18 July 2020, Mankivka served as an administrative center of Mankivka Raion. The raion was abolished in July 2020 as part of the administrative reform of Ukraine, which reduced the number of raions of Cherkasy Oblast to four. The area of Mankivka Raion was merged into Uman Raion.

People from Mankivka 
 Andriy Novikov (born 1999), Ukrainian footballer

Gallery

References

External links
 

Urban-type settlements in Uman Raion
Umansky Uyezd